Vincent Oshana is an American actor and comedian best known for his HBO Stand-Up Comedy Set on Russell Simmons's Def Comedy Jam and various roles on Showtime channel's television series The Underground.

He began his comedy career in his family's living room, imitating cartoon characters and TV personalities. After high school, Vincent joined the United States Air Force and was promoted to Staff Sergeant, earning medals for his various achievements.

Following his tour of duty, Vincent returned to Los Angeles to pursue his dream of becoming an actor and stand-up comedian. He attended the Groundling's Improvisation School, and also studied acting at the Aaron Speiser Acting Studio, Los Angeles, CA.

After living in his car for a time, Vincent landed a part on MTV's Yo Mamma, and was later discovered at an open mic night by Damon Wayan's niece. Wayans subsequently cast him on his sketch comedy series, The Underground, on Showtime.

Vincent has also appeared in various guest starring roles on network television and has also appeared on Russell Simmons' Def Comedy Jam on HBO. A paid regular at the world famous Laugh Factory and Improv comedy club in Hollywood, Vincent tours across America, and the globe, with his stand-up comedy.

Early and personal life 
Vincent was born in Yonkers, New York and is Assyrian.

References

External links
 
 Vincent Oshana's Official MySpace

Living people
American stand-up comedians
American male television actors
American television writers
American male television writers
People from Yonkers, New York
American male screenwriters
Screenwriters from New York (state)
21st-century American comedians
21st-century American screenwriters
21st-century American male writers
Year of birth missing (living people)